The 1888–89 season was the 18th season of competitive association football in England.

Overview
A new competition, The Football League, started this season. The Football League was open to clubs all over the United Kingdom, but the first twelve entrants (Accrington, Aston Villa, Blackburn Rovers, Bolton Wanderers, Burnley, Derby County, Everton, Notts County, Preston North End, Stoke (now Stoke City), West Bromwich Albion and Wolverhampton Wanderers) were all from the Midlands or North of England (in later years the competition became the de facto English league, though some clubs from outside England still compete in it). Each club in the League played each other twice (once at home and once away) and would be awarded two points for a win, one for a draw and none for a loss. From these points, a league table was drawn up. Preston North End were in first place at the end of the season and thus became the first ever Football League champions. They did not lose a match all season (a feat only accomplished once since, by Arsenal in 2003–04) and also won the FA Cup.

The Football League is still going today and now has 72 clubs in three divisions (down from an all-time high of 92 clubs in four divisions). Since the 1992–93 season, it has become only the second-most important league competition, behind the FA Premier League in the English football league system.

Events
Sheffield United F.C. formed on 22 March 1889 from the Sheffield United Cricket Club in a meeting at the Adelphi Hotel.  They played their home matches at Bramall Lane

National team

England finished second in the 1888–89 British Home Championship, which was won by Scotland.

John Yates, of Burnley, scored 3 goals against Ireland in his only appearance for England.

Key
 BHC = 1888–89 British Home Championship

1889 British Home Championship table

Honours

* Indicates new record for competition

FA Cup

Final

The Football League

League table

Stadia and locations

Top scorers

References

External links
Details of England v Wales game
Details of England v Ireland game
Details of England v Scotland game